National Route 487 is a national highway of Japan. The highway connects Kure, Hiroshima and Minami-ku, Hiroshima.

References

487
Roads in Hiroshima Prefecture